Drest son of Munait was a king of the Picts from 549 to 550. The Pictish Chronicle king lists have him reign for one year between Talorc II and Galam Cennalath.

References
Anderson, Alan Orr, Early Sources of Scottish History A.D 500–1286, volume 1. Reprinted with corrections. Paul Watkins, Stamford, 1990.

External links
Pictish Chronicle

550 deaths
Pictish monarchs
6th-century Scottish monarchs
Year of birth unknown